A kitchen appliance lift (Geman: Parallelschwenkmechanik) is a tiltable shelf, particularly suitable for use with heavy or noisy kitchen appliances (such as stand mixers), so that the machine can be easily stored and run under the kitchen counter. When folded, the lift will typically fit inside a cupboard under the countertop, and when expanded the top of the shelf will usually be level with the countertop and cause the cupboard door having to be left open. The lifting mechanism is often spring-assisted so that the user does not have to lift the entire weight of the kitchen appliance.

Width 
Internal cabinet width (for example measured in millimeters) is a factor that can impact which types of kitchen cabinets a lifter will fit in. Some lifters can be used with several widths, while others must have a specific internal cabinet width (for example 500 mm or 600 mm). Some lifters are made to fit the 32 mm cabinetmaking system. Some lifters are mounted at the bottom of cupboards, while others are mounted on its sides. It is not uncommon for mechanisms to be sold without a shelf plate.

Load capacity 
The maximum load of the lifter (for example measured in kilograms) should be higher than the food appliance as well as the ingredients and other things that will load the lifter (for example 15 kg or 30 kg). The mass of stand mixers vary, but generally may lie around 10 to 20 kg, and often at least 14 kg. One manufacturer offers 3 settings of the spring tension for the lifter to work with machines weighing 0-9 kg, 9-14 kg or 14-27 kg, respectively.

See also 
 Human factors and ergonomics
 Drawer slides
 Lift table
 Parallel motion linkage
 Roll-out shelf

References

External links 
 Demonstration of an appliance lift by Rev-A-Lift (YouTube)

Food preparation utensils
Domestic implements